Jean-Claude Carle (9 June 1948 – 13 December 2019) was a French politician. He served as a member of the Senate of France from 1995 to 2018, representing the Haute-Savoie department.  He was a member of the Union for a Popular Movement.

Prior to joining the Senate, Carle was involved in local politics, first as a councilor on the Regional council of Rhône-Alpes And later as a councilor for the department of Haute-Savoie. He won his Senate seat in the 2014 French Senate election and was re-elected in 2004 and 2014. In 2018, he resigned his seat to make way for Sylviane Noël, who became the first woman Senator from Haute-Savoie.

Carle died on 13 December 2019 at the age of 71.

References

1948 births
2019 deaths
The Republicans (France) politicians
Union for a Popular Movement politicians
French Senators of the Fifth Republic
Senators of Haute-Savoie
Politicians from Chambéry